Harriet Lee (born 6 May 1991) is a British Paralympic swimmer who represented Great Britain at the 2012 Summer Paralympics.

Personal life
Lee was born in Huntingdon, England and has been swimming since she was a baby and competing since 2002. She has Beckwith-wiedemann syndrome meaning the left side of her body is shorter than her right. She also struggles to control her blood sugar levels.

Career
Lee first represented Great Britain in 2010 at the World championships in the Netherlands where she won silver in the women's 4x100 individual medley 34 point relay and gold in the 100m Breaststroke SB9. Although selected Harriet missed out on competing at the European championship in 2011 through illness.

In the 2012 British Championships in London she won a gold medal in the 100m Breaststroke SB9 competition and on 8 September 2012 at the 2012 Paralympics she won a bronze medal in the same event having broken the European record in the heats with a time of 1min 19.44 secs. Only four months before the event she had been in intensive care in hospital.

References

1991 births
Living people
People from Huntingdon
English female swimmers
Swimmers at the 2012 Summer Paralympics
Paralympic bronze medalists for Great Britain
Medalists at the 2012 Summer Paralympics
S10-classified Paralympic swimmers
Swimmers at the 2016 Summer Paralympics
Medalists at the 2016 Summer Paralympics
Medalists at the World Para Swimming Championships
Medalists at the World Para Swimming European Championships
Paralympic medalists in swimming
Paralympic swimmers of Great Britain
British female breaststroke swimmers
21st-century British women